Billin (also spelled Bellin) is a village in northwestern Syria, administratively part of the Hama Governorate, located southwest of Hama. Nearby localities include Bisin to the south, al-Muaa to the southeast, Kafr Buhum to the east, al-Rabiaa to the northeast, Umm al-Tuyour to the north, Deir al-Salib to the northwest, Masyaf to the west, al-Bayyadiyah and al-Suwaydah to the southwest. According to the Syria Central Bureau of Statistics, Billin had a population of 2,367 in the 2004 census. Its inhabitants are predominantly Alawites.

References

Bibliography

 

Populated places in Hama District
Alawite communities in Syria